Ukraine competed at the 2016 Summer Olympics in Rio de Janeiro, Brazil, from 5 to 21 August 2016. This was the nation's sixth consecutive appearance at the Summer Olympics in the post-Soviet era.

Ukraine's medal tally was its lowest since independence, with only two gold and eleven total medals, a far cry from 9 gold and 23 total medals at the 1996 Summer Olympics and less than five gold and 19 medals overall at the 2012 Summer Olympics.

Medalists

| width="78%" align="left" valign="top" |

| width="22%" align="left" valign="top" |

| width="22%" align="left" valign="top" |

Competitors

| width=78% align=left valign=top |
The following is the list of number of competitors participating in the Games. Note that reserves in fencing (3 competitors for Ukraine) are counted as athletes in the table:

Archery
 
One Ukrainian archer qualified each for the men's individual recurve by obtaining one of the eight Olympic places available from the 2015 World Archery Championships in Copenhagen, Denmark. Three Ukrainian archers qualified for the women's events by virtue of the nation's podium finish in the team recurve competition at the 2016 Archery World Cup meet in Antalya, Turkey.

Athletics
 
Ukrainian athletes achieved qualifying standards in the following athletics events (up to a maximum of 3 athletes in each event):

Track & road events
Men

Women

Field events
Men

Women

Combined events – Men's decathlon

Combined events – Women's heptathlon

Badminton

Ukraine qualified two badminton players for each of the following events into the Olympic tournament. Artem Pochtarev and Marija Ulitina were selected among the top 34 individual shuttlers each in the men's and women's singles based on the BWF World Rankings as of 5 May 2016.

Boxing
 
Ukraine entered five boxers to compete in each of the following weight classes into the Olympic boxing tournament. With the top seed Nicola Adams of Great Britain advancing to the semifinals at the World Championships, Tetyana Kob earned an Olympic spot as a result of her third-place finish at the 2016 European Qualification Tournament in Samsun, Turkey.

On June 16, 2016, Dmytro Mytrofanov received a spare Olympic berth as the next highest-ranked boxer, not yet qualified, in the middleweight division of the AIBA Pro Boxing Rankings, after Turkey's Adem Kılıççı was suspended for failing the re-tested doping sample on steroids from London 2012.

Bantamweight boxer Mykola Butsenko secured an additional Olympic spot with his quarterfinal triumph at the 2016 AIBA World Qualifying Tournament in Baku, Azerbaijan, while Volodymyr Matviichuk and Denys Solonenko rounded out the Ukrainian roster at the 2016 APB and WSB Olympic Qualifier in Vargas, Venezuela.

Canoeing

Slalom
Ukraine qualified one canoeist in the women's K-1 class by obtaining a top finish at the 2016 European Canoe Slalom Championships in Liptovský Mikuláš, Slovakia.

Sprint
Ukrainian canoeists qualified a total of three boats in each of the following distances for the Games through the 2015 ICF Canoe Sprint World Championships.

Eight sprint canoeists (four per gender) were selected to the Ukrainian roster for the Games, with Iurii Cheban looking to defend his Olympic title in the men's C-1 200 metres.

Men

Women

Qualification Legend: FA = Qualify to final (medal); FB = Qualify to final B (non-medal)

Cycling

Road
Ukrainian riders qualified for the following quota places in the men's and women's Olympic road race by virtue of their top 15 final national ranking in the 2015 UCI Europe Tour (for men) and top 22 in the 2016 UCI World Ranking (for women).

Track
Following the completion of the 2016 UCI Track Cycling World Championships, Ukraine entered one rider to compete only in the Olympics, by virtue of her final individual UCI Olympic ranking in that event.

Keirin

Mountain biking
Ukrainian mountain bikers qualified for two women's quota places into the Olympic cross-country race, as a result of the nation's eighth-place finish in the UCI Olympic Ranking List of May 25, 2016.

Diving

Ukrainian divers qualified for the following individual spots and synchronized teams at the Olympics through the 2015 FINA World Championships and the 2016 FINA World Cup series.

Men

Women

Equestrian
 
Ukraine fielded a squad of four jumping riders into the Olympic equestrian competition by virtue of a top national finish from Central & Eastern Europe at the FEI qualification event in Šamorín, Slovakia. One dressage rider was added to the squad by virtue of a top six finish outside the group selection in the individual FEI Olympic Rankings.

Dressage

Jumping

"TO" indicates that the rider only qualified for the team competition. "#" indicates that the score of this rider does not count in the team competition, since only the best three results of a team are counted.

Fencing

Ukrainian fencers qualified a full squad each in the men's team épée and women's team sabre by virtue of their top 4 national finish in the FIE Olympic Team Rankings, while the women's épée team claimed the spot as the highest ranking team from Europe outside the world's top four. Meanwhile, sabre fencer Andriy Yahodka claimed his Olympic spot by finishing among the top four individuals at the European Zonal Qualifier in Prague, Czech Republic.

The full Ukrainian fencing team, led by London 2012 épée champion Yana Shemyakina and sabre bronze medalist Olha Kharlan, was named on July 5, 2016. Olha Leleiko received a spare berth freed up by Israel to compete in the women's foil as the next highest-ranked fencer, not yet qualified, at the European Zonal Qualifier in Prague, before she was added to the nation's fencing team on July 25, 2016.

Men

Women

Gymnastics

Artistic
Ukraine fielded a full team of six artistic gymnasts (five men and one woman) into the Olympic competition. The men's squad claimed one of the remaining four spots in the team all-around, while Angelina Kysla accepted the Olympic berth as a lone Ukrainian female gymnast in the apparatus and individual all-around events at the Olympic Test Event in Rio de Janeiro.

Men
Team

Individual finals

Women

Rhythmic 
Ukraine qualified a squad of rhythmic gymnasts for the individual and group all-around by finishing in the top 15 (for individual) and top 10 (for group) at the 2015 World Championships in Stuttgart, Germany.

Trampoline
Ukraine qualified one gymnast in the women's trampoline by virtue of a top six finish at the 2016 Olympic Test Event in Rio de Janeiro.

Judo

Ukraine qualified a total of seven judokas for each of the following weight classes at the Games. Six of them (three per gender), highlighted by London 2012 Olympians Georgii Zantaraia and Artem Bloshenko, were ranked among the top 14 eligible judokas for women in the IJF World Ranking List of May 30, 2016, while Quedjau Nhabali at men's middleweight (70 kg) earned a continental quota spot from the European region, as the highest-ranked Ukrainian judoka outside of direct qualifying position. The judo team was named to the Olympic roster on June 1, 2016.

Men

Women

Modern pentathlon
 
Ukrainian athletes qualified for the following spots to compete in modern pentathlon. Andriy Fedechko and 2012 Olympian Pavlo Tymoshchenko secured a selection in the men's event by filling in two out of the three Olympic quota places at the 2015 World Championships, while Anastasiya Spas added a spot in the women's event to the roster through the European Championships.

Rowing

Ukraine qualified two boats for each of the following rowing classes into the Olympic regatta. One rowing crew confirmed an Olympic place for their boat in the men's quadruple sculls at the 2015 FISA World Championships in Lac d'Aiguebelette, France, while the rowers competing in the women's quadruple sculls were added to the Ukrainian roster with their top two finish at the 2016 European & Final Qualification Regatta in Lucerne, Switzerland.

Eight rowers (four per gender) were selected to the Ukrainian roster for the Games, with Anastasiya Kozhenkova looking to defend the Olympic title with the women's quadruple sculls crew (Buryak, Nimchenko, & Verkhogliad).

Qualification Legend: FA=Final A (medal); FB=Final B (non-medal); FC=Final C (non-medal); FD=Final D (non-medal); FE=Final E (non-medal); FF=Final F (non-medal); SA/B=Semifinals A/B; SC/D=Semifinals C/D; SE/F=Semifinals E/F; QF=Quarterfinals; R=Repechage

Sailing

Ukrainian sailors qualified one boat in each of the following classes through the individual fleet World Championships, and European qualifying regattas.

M = Medal race; EL = Eliminated – did not advance into the medal race

Shooting
 
Ukrainian shooters achieved quota places for the following events by virtue of their best finishes at the 2014 and 2015 ISSF World Championships, the 2015 ISSF World Cup series, and European Championships or Games, as long as they obtained a minimum qualifying score (MQS) by March 31, 2016.

Men

Women

Qualification Legend: Q = Qualify for the next round; q = Qualify for the bronze medal (shotgun)

Swimming

Ukrainian swimmers achieved qualifying standards in the following events (up to a maximum of 2 swimmers in each event at the Olympic Qualifying Time (OQT), and potentially 1 at the Olympic Selection Time (OST)):

Men

Women

Synchronized swimming

For the first time in Olympic history, Ukraine fielded a squad of nine synchronized swimmers to compete in both the women's team and duet routine by virtue of their first-place finish at the FINA Olympic test event in Rio de Janeiro.

Table tennis

Ukraine entered three athletes into the table tennis competition at the Games. 2008 Olympian and 2015 European Games bronze medalist Kou Lei secured one of the remaining Olympic spots in the men's singles by winning the repechage play-off match at the European Qualification Tournament in Halmstad, Sweden.

Two-time Olympian Tetyana Bilenko was automatically selected among the top 22 eligible players to confirm her third Olympic appearance in the women's singles. Margaryta Pesotska was originally granted an invitation from ITTF to compete in the same event as one of the next seven highest-ranked eligible players, not yet qualified, on the Olympic Ranking List, but later withdrew from the Games due to injury.

Tennis

Ukraine entered seven tennis players (three men and four women) into the Olympic tournament. Rookies Illya Marchenko (world no. 73), Elina Svitolina (world no. 19), and Lesia Tsurenko (world no. 44) qualified directly among the top 56 eligible players in their respective singles events based on the ATP and WTA World Rankings as of June 6, 2016.

Having been directly entered to the singles, Marchenko and Svitolina also opted to play with their partners Denys Molchanov and Olga Savchuk, respectively, in the doubles tournament, while sisters Lyudmyla and Nadiia Kichenok claimed one of eight ITF Olympic women's doubles places, as Ukraine's top-ranked tennis pair outside of direct qualifying position.

Lesia Tsurenko withdrew from the Games before the opening match due to health reasons.

Men

 
Women

Triathlon

Ukraine entered two triathletes to compete at the Games. Two-time Olympian Yuliya Yelistratova was ranked among the top 40 eligible triathletes in the women's event, while Ivan Ivanov received a spare berth freed up by one of the Germans to compete in the men's event as the next highest-ranked eligible triathlete, not yet qualified, in the ITU Olympic Qualification List as of May 15, 2016.

Weightlifting

Ukrainian weightlifters qualified four men's and four women's quota places for the Rio Olympics based on their combined team standing by points at the 2014 and 2015 IWF World Championships. The team had to allocate these places to individual athletes by June 20, 2016.

On 2 August 2016, Roman Zaitsev withdrew from the Games due to injury. Instead, Ihor Shymechko took over the vacant spot to compete in the men's super heavyweight division (+105 kg).

Men

Women

Wrestling

Ukraine qualified a total of nine wrestlers for each of the following weight classes into the Olympic competition. Five of them finished among the top six to book Olympic spots in the men's freestyle (97 kg), men's Greco-Roman (85, 98, & 130 kg), and women's freestyle (63 kg) at the 2015 World Championships, while two more Olympic berths were awarded to Ukrainian wrestlers, who progressed to the top two finals at the 2016 European Qualification Tournament.

Three further wrestlers claimed the remaining Olympic slots to round out the Ukrainian roster at the final meet of the World Qualification Tournament in Istanbul.

On May 11, 2016, United World Wrestling (UWW) decided to revoke two Olympic licenses from Ukraine in men's freestyle 66 kg and women's freestyle 58 kg, respectively, due to doping violations at the European Qualification Tournament, but these licenses were redistributed back two months later.

Men's freestyle

Men's Greco-Roman

Women's freestyle

See also
Ukraine at the 2016 Summer Paralympics

References

External links 

 

Olympics
Nations at the 2016 Summer Olympics
2016